Mark's Keyboard Repair is the debut studio album by American musician Money Mark, originally released on the Mo' Wax label in 1995. It peaked at number 35 on the UK Albums Chart. NME listed it as the 24th best album of 1995.

"Insects Are All Around Us" / "Cry" was released as a single and reached number 99 on the UK Singles Chart. Later, "Cry" was released as a single again and reached number 80 on the chart.

Track listing

Personnel
Credits adapted from liner notes.
 Mark Ramos-Nishita – production
 James Lavelle – A&R
 Brian McPherson – legal representation
 Ben Drury – sleeve design
 Will Bankhead – sleeve design
 Paul "Jazz" Thompson – color photography
 Mario Caldato Jr. – black and white photography

Charts

References

External links
 

1995 debut albums
Money Mark albums
Mo' Wax albums